The Beijing Suburbs Daily, or Jingjiao Ribao, originally named Beijing Daily Suburban Edition (北京日报郊区版), was a Chinese-language daily newspaper published in China. Founded by Beijing Daily Agency (北京日报社) on October 3, 1980, it was one of the series of newspapers of Beijing Daily Press Group (北京日报报业集团).

History
Beijing Suburbs Daily was formerly known as Beijing Daily Suburban Edition, which was developed from Beijing Peasants' Post (北京农民报), a newspaper sponsored on 9 February 1958, by the Rural Work Department of the Beijing Municipal Committee of the Communist Party of China (中国共产党北京市委农村工作部).

On January 1, 1994, Beijing Daily Suburban Edition was changed to its current name.

On December 29, 2018, Beijing Suburbs Daily stopped publication.

References

Defunct newspapers published in China
Newspapers established in 2009
2009 establishments in China
Publications disestablished in 2020
Chinese-language newspapers (Simplified Chinese)